This is a list of anti-tank guided missiles developed by different countries.

Australia 
 Malkara

Argentina 
 Mathogo

Belarus 
Shershen

Brazil 
MSS-1.2
FOG-MPM
ALAC

Canada 
Eryx

China 
CM-501G
AFT-10
PA02-MA
PA01-GA
TS-01
HJ-73
HJ-8
HJ-9
CM-502KG
HJ-11
HJ-10
BA-9
BA-7
AR-1
AKD-10
Type 98 anti-tank rocket
Type 78/65
AFT-10
HJ-12

France 
APILAS
ENTAC
Eryx
SS.10
SS.11
 MILAN
 HOT

Polyphem
TRIGAT LR
 Missile Moyenne Portée
Missile Longue Portée

Germany 
 Cobra
 Cobra 2000
 Mamba
 MILAN
 HOT
 PARS 3

Hungary
 Hungarian 44M

India 
DRDO Anti Tank Missile
Amogha missile
Nag missile
HELINA /Dhruvastra
SANT
MPATGM
 SAMHO cannon launched anti tank guided missile
Jasmine anti tank missile - VEM technologies

Iran 
 RAAD
 Tosan
 Dehlavieh/9M133 Kornet
 Saeghe
 Toophan
 Sadid-1
 Sadid-345
 Almaz
 Ghaem-114
 Ghaem-1
 Ghaem-5
 Ghaem-9
 Akhgar NLOS

Israel 
 Orev (upgraded BGM-71 TOW-2)
 MAPATS
 LAHAT – fired through smoothbore tank gun tubes of Merkava tanks
 Spike 
 Nimrod

Italy 

 Mosquito

Japan 
Type 64 MAT 
Type 79 Jyu-MAT 
Type 87 Chu-MAT 
Type 96 MPMS
Middle range Multi-Purpose missile
Type 01 LMAT

Jordan 

 Terminator

North Korea 
Bulsae-1
Bulsae-2
Bulsae-3

South Korea 
 AT-1K Raybolt

Pakistan 
Barq
Baktar Shikan

Baktar Shikan (Air launched Variant)

Poland 
Pirat (ATGM)
MOSKIT (ATGM)

Serbia 
 Bumbar
 ALAS

South Africa 
 ZT3 Ingwe
 Mokopa

Soviet Union and Russian Federation 
 Drakon, used with the IT-1 missile tank that saw very little service.
 Taifun, a prototype missile that never saw production.
 3M6 Shmel (AT-1 Snapper)
 3M11 Falanga (AT-2 Swatter)
 9M14 Malyutka (AT-3 Sagger)
 9M111 Fagot (AT-4 Spigot)
 9M112 Kobra (AT-8 Songster) – fired through smoothbore tank gun tubes of T-64 and T-72 tanks
 9M113 Konkurs (AT-5 Spandrel)
 9K114 Shturm (AT-6 Spiral) – Can be air-launched
 9K115 Metis (AT-7 Saxhorn)
 9K115-2 Metis-M (AT-13 Saxhorn-2)
 9K116-1 Bastion (AT-10 Stabber) – fired through rifled tank gun tubes of T-55 tank
 9K118 Sheksna (AT-12 Swinger) – fired through smoothbore tank gun tubes of T-62 tank
 9M119 Svir / 9M119M Refleks (AT-11 Sniper) - fired through smoothbore tank gun tubes of T-64, T-72, T-80, T-84, T-90 tanks
 9M120 Ataka (AT-9 Spiral-2) – Can be air-launched
 9K121 Vikhr (AT-16 Scallion) – air-launched, sometimes confused with AT-9
 9M123 Khrizantema (AT-15 Springer)
 9M133 Kornet (AT-14 Spriggan)
 9M133M Kornet-M
 Hermes-A

Spain 
 C-90
 C-100

Sweden 
 Bantam
 RBS 56 BILL
 RBS 56B BILL 2
 NLAW

Switzerland 
 Cobra

Turkey 
UMTAS (160mm long range anti-tank missile)
OMTAS (160mm medium range anti-tank missile)
KARAOK (125mm man-portable short-range anti-tank missile)
TANOK (120mm  gun launched anti-tank missile)
Cirit (70mm anti-armor missile)

United Kingdom 
 Malkara
 NLAW
 Swingfire
 Brimstone (air-launched)
 Vickers Vigilant

United States 

 M47 Dragon (no longer in service)
 Javelin (in service)
 SRAW (no longer in service)
 BGM-71 TOW (in service)
 AGM-114 Hellfire (in service)

Ukraine 
RK-3 Corsar
Skif (ATGM)
Stuhna-P

See also 
 List of missiles
 Shoulder-launched missile weapon

References

External links 
 Spain signs Spike-LR anti-tank deal Jane's Defence Industry, January 2007
 Red Arrow 8L gains greater capabilities Extract from article about Chinese ATGW system, August 2006
 Antitank weapons at armscontrol.ru.
  Designations of Soviet and Russian Military Aircraft and Missiles

Lists of weapons